Timon is a genus of wall lizards in the family Lacertidae.

Species
The genus Timon contains the following six species which are recognized as being valid.
Timon kurdistanicus  - Kurdistan lizard
Timon lepidus  - ocellated lizard, jewelled lizard
Timon nevadensis  - Sierra Nevada lizard
Timon pater  
Timon princeps  - Siirt lizard, Zagrosian lizard
Timon tangitanus  - Moroccan eyed lizard

Nota bene: A binomial authority in parentheses indicates that the species was originally described in a genus other than Timon.

References

Further reading
Tschudi JJ (1836). "Über ein neues Subgenus von Lacerta Cuv." Isis von Oken 29 (7): 546–551. (Timon, new subgenus, p. 551). (in German and Latin).

 
Lizard genera
Taxa named by Johann Jakob von Tschudi